Melissa Wade has been the Director of Forensics at Emory University, and the head coach of the school's award-winning policy debate team, the Barkley Forum, since 1972.  She has been awarded every national coaching award in her field, and has been honored for her contributions to minority and women's participation in debate and forensics. Wade has coached several national debate champions. She retired in 2015.

Wade is a founder and developer of the urban debate league movement, as well as the Executive co-director of the National Debate Project.

She is originally from Houston, Texas, and is a graduate of Emory with undergraduate and multiple graduate degrees.

References

External links
Barkley Forum page on Melissa Wade
A judging philosophy statement from Melissa Wade

Emory University faculty
Living people
Year of birth missing (living people)